Tranmere Rovers F.C. played the 1927–28 season in the Football League Third Division North. It was their seventh season of league football, and they finished 5th of 22. They reached the Third Round of the FA Cup.

Football League

References 

Tranmere Rovers F.C. seasons